, or  is a Buddhist temple belonging to the Eigen-ji branch of Rinzai school, located in the city of Takahashi in Okayama Prefecture in Japan. It is best known for its Japanese garden.

History
The exact date at which in the original temple which was located on the site was built is unknown. In 1339 AD it was rebuilt by Ashikaga Takauji, the Ashikaga shogunate's first shōgun, and made it the Ankoku-ji of Bitchū Province.

The current structure dates back to 1504 AD, when Ueno Yorihisa (Raikyū), the lord of Bitchū Matsuyama Castle, restored the exterior of the building.  After his death it was renamed Ankoku Raikyū-ji in his honour.

The garden
When  Kobori Masatugu, the governor of the area, died in 1604, he was succeeded to the post by his son Kobori Enshū, who in addition to his fame as a garden designer, is regarded for being one of the original founders of the Japanese tea ceremony.  Kobori, who lived at the temple, is said to have built the present zen'in-shiki (or Zen temple form) garden in the "Horai style" which is designed to emphasize spiritual peace and harmony in its composition and in the consciousness of the viewer. It uses the nearby Mount Atago in the background to form a shakkei ("borrowed view") common to this style of garden.  The garden is also known as Tsurukame Garden on account of the two stone islands in the garden named "Crane" and "Tortoise" island respectively.
Since it was completed in 1609, the abbots of the temple have maintained the garden in its original form, in honour of its designer.

References

External links
  Raikyū-ji website

Gardens in Okayama Prefecture
Buddhist temples in Okayama Prefecture
Places of Scenic Beauty